Olympian Village is a city in Jefferson County, Missouri, United States. The population was 774 at the 2010 census. The city was named in honor of Greek myth and culture. Some street names include Parthenon Drive, Kronos Drive, Hercules Place, Plato Place, and Pheidippides Place.

Geography
Olympian Village is located at  (38.134561, -90.459475).

Government 
Olympian Village is a fourth class city incorporated in 1965, which consists primarily of a single subdivision of single-family homes built in the 1960s.

Public safety
Olympian Village is serviced by the part paid, part volunteer, Hematite Fire Protection District which operates a station nearby, about halfway between Olympian Village and nearby Festus. Olympian Village was served by its own police department, which was a volunteer program until 2005, when state and federal grants allowed for a full-time, paid police department. In 2009, local officials disbanded the department due to a lack of funding. Service resumed in 2010 in the form of another volunteer police department, where officers worked without pay. Joachim-Plattin Ambulance District operates station 4 in Olympian Village which is staffed 24 hours per day, year-round.

Demographics

2010 census
As of the census of 2010, there were 774 people, 246 households, and 201 families living in the city. The racial makeup of the city was 97.3% White, 0.4% African American, 0.3% Native American, 0.5% Asian, 0.4% from other races, and 1.2% from two or more races. Hispanic or Latino of any race were 1.6% of the population.

There were 246 households, of which 49.6% had children under the age of 18 living with them, 54.5% were married couples living together, 20.7% had a female householder with no husband present, 6.5% had a male householder with no wife present, and 18.3% were non-families. 13.0% of all households were made up of individuals, and 4% had someone living alone who was 65 years of age or older. The average household size was 3.15 and the average family size was 3.27.

The median age in the city was 32.2 years. 30.9% of residents were under the age of 18; 9.3% were between the ages of 18 and 24; 28.6% were from 25 to 44; 25.3% were from 45 to 64; and 5.8% were 65 years of age or older. The gender makeup of the city was 47.8% male and 52.2% female.

2000 census
As of the census of 2000, there were 669 people, 217 households, and 182 families living in the city. The racial makeup of the city was 97.61% White, 0.30% Native American, 1.49% Asian, and 0.60% from two or more races. Hispanic or Latino of any race were 0.60% of the population.

There were 217 households, out of which 43.8% had children under the age of 18 living with them, 64.1% were married couples living together, 12.4% had a female householder with no husband present, and 16.1% were non-families. 12.0% of all households were made up of individuals, and 4.1% had someone living alone who was 65 years of age or older. The average household size was 3.08 and the average family size was 3.30.

In the city, the population was spread out, with 29.6% under the age of 18, 10.8% from 18 to 24, 33.3% from 25 to 44, 20.0% from 45 to 64, and 6.3% who were 65 years of age or older. The median age was 30 years. For every 100 females, there were 97.9 males. For every 100 females age 18 and over, there were 103.0 males.

The median income for a household in the city was $41,447, and the median income for a family was $43,438. Males had a median income of $30,694 versus $19,514 for females. The per capita income for the city was $14,928. About 9.3% of families and 10.2% of the population were below the poverty line, including 10.5% of those under age 18 and none of those age 65 or over.

References

Cities in Jefferson County, Missouri
Cities in Missouri